Harith Maduwantha (born 7 October 1994) is a Sri Lankan cricketer. He made his first-class debut for Sinhalese Sports Club in the 2015–16 Premier League Tournament on 4 December 2015.

References

External links
 

1994 births
Living people
Sri Lankan cricketers
Sinhalese Sports Club cricketers
Tamil Union Cricket and Athletic Club cricketers
Cricketers from Colombo